The 1904 Currie Cup was the seventh edition of the Currie Cup, the premier domestic rugby union competition in South Africa.

See also

 Currie Cup

References

1904
1904 in South African rugby union
Currie